Tote António Gomes (born 16 January 1999), known as Toti, is a Bissau-Guinean-Portuguese professional footballer who plays as a centre-back for Wolverhampton Wanderers. Born in Guinea-Bissau, he has played for the Portugal U20 national team.

Club career
Toti made his LigaPro debut for Estoril on 5 May 2019 in a game against Académico Viseu.

On 2 September 2020, Toti was signed by English Premier League side Wolverhampton Wanderers and immediately loaned out to Swiss Challenge League side Grasshopper Club Zürich for the 2020–21 season. His first appearance for the Swiss club was a start in the opening game, against Winterthur, which Grasshopper won. His scored first goal for the Swiss side during a 5–2 loss against Kriens.

After a successful campaign with the Swiss club, which saw them promoted to the Swiss Super League, Toti returned to Grasshoppers on another season-long loan. He spent the first half of the 2021–22 season at Grasshopper but was then recalled by his parent club to spend January training at Wolverhampton before a potential return to Switzerland.

With Romain Saïss away at the Africa Cup of Nations, Wolverhampton recalled Toti at the same time as signing his Grasshoppers team mate, Hayao Kawabe. Toti made his Wolverhampton Wanderers début in Saïss's position on 15 January 2022 in a 3–1 Premier League victory over Southampton at Molineux. On 21 March 2022, Toti signed a new contract with Wolves until 2027.

Career statistics

Club

References

External links
Profile at the Wolverhampton Wanderers F.C. website

1999 births
Living people
Sportspeople from Bissau
Portuguese footballers
Portugal youth international footballers
Bissau-Guinean footballers
Bissau-Guinean emigrants to Portugal
Portuguese people of Bissau-Guinean descent
Association football defenders
Liga Portugal 2 players
Swiss Challenge League players
Swiss Super League players
G.D. Estoril Praia players
Wolverhampton Wanderers F.C. players
Grasshopper Club Zürich players
Portuguese expatriate footballers
Bissau-Guinean expatriate footballers
Expatriate footballers in Switzerland
Premier League players